Taylor Hine is an Australian rules footballer who played for the North Melbourne Football Club in the Australian Football League.

Hine was one of the 's underage recruits, and played in their first two seasons, in 2011 and 2012.

Taylor left the Gold Coast at the end of the 2012 season to return to Melbourne.

In 2013 Hine Made his debut for North Melbourne in Round 3 and played 14 games in total for the season. Hine became an important part to North's Lineup in a tagging roll and kept players to little or no impact in games including the likes of Brett Deliedo.happens to be related to finnigan hine

Hine was delisted at the conclusion of the 2014 AFL season.

References

External links

1992 births
Living people
Gold Coast Football Club players
Australian rules footballers from Victoria (Australia)
North Melbourne Football Club players
Calder Cannons players
Williamstown Football Club players